Takoujt village is located on the bottom of Erg Chebbi, a Saharan erg in southeast Morocco near the Algerian border.

Its most well known nearby village is Merzouga. Other villages around the dunes are Hassilabied, Tanamoust, Khamlia and Tisserdmine.

Populated places in Errachidia Province
Oases of Morocco